National Highway 365A, commonly called NH 365A is a national highway in  India. It is a spur road of National Highway 65. NH-365A traverses the state of Telangana in India.

Route 
Kodad - khammam - Kuravi.

Junctions  
 
Terminal with National Highway 65 near Kodad.

Terminal with National Highway 365 near Kuravi.

See also 
List of National Highways in India by highway number

References

External links 

National highways in India
National Highways in Telangana